François-Xavier Dumortier, S.J. (born 4 November 1948) is a French Roman Catholic priest. He was rector of the Pontifical Gregorian University in Rome from 1 September 2010 to 1 September 2016, when he was succeeded by Nuno da Silva Gonçalves.

Biography
François-Xavier Dumortier was born on 4 November 1948 in Levroux, France, and entered the Society of Jesus at the age of 25. He was ordained as a priest in 1982, and made his final vows as a Jesuit in 1990.

Dumortier was a philosophy professor for twenty years; he taught in particular at the Centre Sèvres, the Jesuit faculty of philosophy and theology in France. He was rector of that faculty from 1997 to 2003. Afterwards, Dumortier was superior of the French province of the Society of Jesus until 2009.

On 27 April 2010, Pope Benedict XVI announced that the rector of the Pontifical Gregorian University, the Rev. Gianfranco Ghirlanda, S.J., would be succeeded by Father Dumortier as the next rector of the university. The appointment took effect on 1 September 2010.

Pope Francis named Dumortier to participate in the Synod of Bishops on the Family in October.

References

External links
Interview with Fr. Dumortier  

1948 births
Living people
20th-century French Jesuits
21st-century French Jesuits
Pontifical Gregorian University rectors
People from Indre